WEUC (88.7 FM) is a radio station broadcasting the EWTN network's Ave Maria Radio. Licensed to Morganfield, Kentucky, United States, the station serves Morganfield and surrounding areas. The station also comes in around Evansville, Indiana, though the signal there is weak.

"WEUC" used to be the call letters of Emisora Universidad Católica (English: Catholic University Broadcasting), the radio station broadcasting of the Catholic University of Puerto Rico, in Ponce, Puerto Rico until the university changed its name in 1991 after Pope John Paul II bestowed on the university the title of pontifical. The PUCPR's radio station call letters were subsequently changed to "WPUC" (Pontificia Universidad Católica [English: Pontifical Catholic University]) in order to reflect the university's new name.

See also 
 WSGJ-LP: Catholic radio station in Bowling Green, Kentucky

References

External links

Morganfield, Kentucky
2008 establishments in Kentucky
Radio stations established in 2008
Catholic radio stations
Catholic Church in Kentucky
Christian radio stations in Kentucky